James C. Tunney (25 December 1924 – 16 January 2002) was an Irish Fianna Fáil politician.

Early and personal life
He was born 25 December 1924 in Finglas, Dublin, the fourth child among three sons and five daughters of James Tunney, a farmer and Labour Party TD and senator, and M. Ellen Tunney (née Grimes), who both came from outside Westport, County Mayo. He was educated at St. Vincent's C.B.S. in Glasnevin. 

He worked in the Department of Agriculture from 1943 to 1955 and it was in this period that he studied part-time at University College Dublin, where he took a BA in drama, English, and Irish before studying for a postgraduate qualification in Irish. From 1955 to 1962 he taught drama at VECs in Lucan, Balbriggan, and Garretstown, before being appointed headmaster of Blanchardstown VEC in 1962.

He also played at senior level for the Dublin county team. He was on the winning side for Dublin in the 1948 All-Ireland Junior Football Championship.

A snappy dresser who earned the nickname – the yellow rose of Finglas, he was sometimes seen as pompous, a perception possibly attributable to his acting background, which once led to an audition for Dublin's Abbey Theatre.

Politics
In 1963 he joined Fianna Fáil, and stood for the party at the  1965 general election but was not elected. He was elected to Dáil Éireann as a Fianna Fáil Teachta Dála (TD) for the Dublin North-West constituency at the 1969 general election. He served continuously in the Dáil until losing his seat at the 1992 general election, having been a TD for Dublin Finglas from 1977 to 1981 when Dublin constituencies were reconfigured as 3-seaters, before being returned for Dublin North-West in 1981. 

During that period he served as Parliamentary Secretary to the Minister for Education (after 1978, Minister of State at the Department of Education) in three governments. He served as Leas-Cheann Comhairle of Dáil Éireann from 1981 to 1982, and from 1987 to 1993. He was also Chairman of Fianna Fáil for ten years. He was a member of Dublin City Council, and served as Lord Mayor of Dublin from 1984 to 1985.

References

 

1924 births
2002 deaths
Dublin inter-county Gaelic footballers
Fianna Fáil TDs
Irish sportsperson-politicians
Lord Mayors of Dublin
Members of the 19th Dáil
Members of the 20th Dáil
Members of the 21st Dáil
Members of the 22nd Dáil
Members of the 23rd Dáil
Members of the 24th Dáil
Members of the 25th Dáil
Members of the 26th Dáil
Ministers of State of the 21st Dáil
Parliamentary Secretaries of the 19th Dáil
Politicians from County Dublin
People educated at St. Vincent's C.B.S., Glasnevin